Joaquim Rifé Climent (born 4 February 1942 in Barcelona, Catalonia) was a Spanish footballer, captain of the FC Barcelona, who has most worn the Barcelona shirt a total of 548 played matches. He played in the first team for 12 seasons for the club, between 1964 and 1976.
Following his retirement as a player, he became one of the team trainers and at the end of the season 1978–79 he took charge of the team along with Torres. This duo helped the team to attain The Recopa of Basilea.

He ranks nine among players, by number of starts, in the history of Barcelona.

His brother Llorenç was also a footballer.

Trophies 
 1 Leagues: 1973–74.
 2 Cups: 1967–68, 1970–71.
 2 Inter-Cities Fairs Cup: 1965–66, 1971 Trophy Play-Off
 1 UEFA Cup Winners' Cup: 1978–79.

References

External links
 Joaquim Rifé at FCBarcelona.com
Rifé Manager
Stats at LFP
Spain footballer stats
Where do Arsenal need Strengthening?

La Liga players
FC Barcelona players
Spanish footballers
Spain international footballers
FC Barcelona managers
Levante UD managers
1942 births
Living people
Association football midfielders
Catalonia international footballers
Footballers from Barcelona
Spanish football managers